The Ecstasy of Saint Teresa (also known as Saint Teresa in Ecstasy or the Transverberation of Saint Teresa;  or ) is a sculptural group in white marble set in an elevated aedicule in the Cornaro Chapel of the church of Santa Maria della Vittoria in Rome. It was designed and completed by Gian Lorenzo Bernini, the leading sculptor of his day, who also designed the setting of the Chapel in marble, stucco and paint. It is generally considered to be one of the sculptural masterpieces of the High Roman Baroque. The sculpture depicts Teresa of Ávila, a Spanish Carmelite nun and saint, swooning in a state of religious ecstasy, while an angel holding a spear stands over her.

Commission 
The entire ensemble was overseen and completed by a mature Bernini during the Pamphili papacy of Innocent X. When Innocent acceded to the papal throne, he shunned Bernini's artistic services; the sculptor had been the favourite artist of the previous and profligate Barberini pope. Without papal patronage, the services of Bernini's studio were therefore available to a patron such as the Venetian Cardinal Federico Cornaro (1579–1653).

Cornaro had chosen the hitherto unremarkable church of the Discalced Carmelites for his burial chapel. The selected site for the chapel was the left transept that had previously held an image of 'St. Paul in Ecstasy', which was replaced by Bernini's dramatization of a religious experience undergone and related by the first Discalced Carmelite saint, who had been canonised not long before, in 1622. It was completed in 1652 for the then princely sum of 12,000 scudi.

The sculpture represents the first embodiment of the project, with traces of Bernini's fingerprints still visible. The model belongs to the Hermitage Museum's collection.

Sculptural group and its setting 
 The two central sculptural figures of the swooning nun and the angel with the spear derive from an episode described by Teresa of Avila, a mystical cloistered Discalced Carmelite reformer and nun, in her autobiography, The Life of Teresa of Jesus (1515–1582). Her experience of religious ecstasy in her encounter with the angel is described as follows:

The group is illuminated by natural light which filters through a hidden window in the dome of the surrounding aedicule, and underscored by gilded stucco rays. Teresa is shown lying on a cloud indicating that this is intended to be a divine apparition we are witnessing. Other witnesses appear on the side walls; life-size high-relief donor portraits of male members of the Cornaro family, e.g. Cardinal Federico Cornaro and Doge Giovanni I Cornaro, are present and shown discussing the event in boxes as if at the theatre. Although the figures are executed in white marble, the aedicule, wall panels and theatre boxes are made from coloured marbles. Above, the vault of the Chapel is frescoed with an illusionistic cherub-filled sky with the descending light of the Holy Ghost allegorized as a dove.

The art historian Rudolf Wittkower wrote:

Interpretations 
The effects are theatrical, the Cornaro family seeming to observe the scene from their boxes, and the chapel illustrates a moment where divinity intrudes on an earthly body. Caroline Babcock speaks of Bernini's melding of sensual and spiritual pleasure in the "orgiastic" grouping as both intentional and influential on artists and writers of the day. Irving Lavin said "the transverberation becomes a point of contact between earth and heaven, between matter and spirit". As Bernini biographer Franco Mormando points out, although Bernini's point of departure for his depiction of Teresa's mystical experience was her own description, there were many details about the experience that she never specifies (e.g., the position of her body) and that Bernini simply supplied from his own artistic imagination, all with an aim of increasing the nearly transgressively sensual charge of the episode: "Certainly no other artist, in rendering the scene, before or after Bernini, dared as much in transforming the saint's appearance."

Similar works by Bernini 
 See also entry titled Bernini's Cornaro chapel found in the Baroque section.
 Death of the Blessed Ludovica Albertoni (1671–1674)—San Francesco a Ripa, Rome.
 Martyrdom of Saint Lawrence (1614–15)
 Truth Unveiled by Time (1646–1652) – Galleria Borghese, Rome.

Influencing or influenced works 
 Stefano Maderno's sculpture of St Cecilia in namesake church (1600).
 Melchiorre Caffà's Santa Rose of Lima (1665) and his Assumption of St Catherine.
 Francisco Aprile and Ercole Ferrata's Sant'Anastasia in her namesake church in Rome.
 The most internationally successful Czech underground group the Ecstasy of Saint Theresa named themselves after the sculpture.
 Angels & Demons, the novel by Dan Brown which lists the sculpture as the third "Altar of Science" of the fictionalized Illuminati.
 The sculpture is the subject of the song "The Lie" from the Peter Hammill album The Silent Corner and the Empty Stage.
 In Infinite Jest by David Foster Wallace, the sculpture plays a role in the filmography of James O. Incandenza, Jr. Wallace also alludes to it in three additional scenes involving Joelle.
 Street artist Banksy used the image of Saint Theresa in one of his works, though he removed the angelic figure and added a fast food meal.
 The sculpture and its image are frequently referred to in the novel Cutting for Stone by Abraham Verghese.
 In the psychoanalytic theories of Jacques Lacan, the statue plays an important role due to a central reference in his book Seminar XX: Encore. Lacan believes the statue helps convey his theory of the possibility of a female enjoyment that is infinite and unknowable, while masculine enjoyment is defined by finitude and failure. Some book covers of Seminar XX have a picture of the statue on the front.

See also 
List of works by Gian Lorenzo Bernini

References 
Notes

Citations

Sources
 
 
 
 Bernini biography (click on Ecstasy of St Teresa)

External links 

 

1652 works
1640s sculptures
1650s sculptures
Sculptures of angels
Marble sculptures in Italy
Sculptures by Gian Lorenzo Bernini
Sculptures of saints
Teresa of Ávila
Sculptures of women in Italy